The 1988 Monte Carlo Open, also known by its sponsored name Volvo Monte Carlo Open, was a men's tennis tournament played on outdoor clay courts at the Monte Carlo Country Club in Roquebrune-Cap-Martin, France that was part of the 1988 Nabisco Grand Prix. It was the 82nd edition of the tournament and was held from 18 April through 24 April 1989. First-seeded Ivan Lendl, who had been sidelined for eight weeks with a stress fracture in his right foot, won the singles title. It was his second singles title at the event after 1985.

Finals

Singles

 Ivan Lendl defeated  Martín Jaite, 5–7, 6–4, 7–5, 6–3
 It was Lendl's 1st singles title of the year and the 71st of his career.

Doubles
 Sergio Casal /  Emilio Sánchez defeated  Henri Leconte /  Ivan Lendl, 6–1, 6–3

References

External links
 
 ATP tournament profile
 ITF tournament edition details

 
1988
1988 in Monégasque sport
1988 in French tennis